In architecture, a squinch is a triangular corner that supports the base of a dome. Its visual purpose is to translate a rectangle into an octagon. See also: pendentive.

Construction

A squinch is typically formed by a masonry arch that spans a square corner.

History in the Middle East

The dome chamber in the Palace of Ardashir, the Sassanid king, in Firuzabad, Iran is the earliest surviving example of the use of the squinch, suggesting that the squinch may have been invented in Persia. After the rise of Islam, it was used in the Middle East in both eastern Romanesque and Islamic architecture. It remained a feature of Islamic architecture, especially in Iran, and was often covered by corbelled stalactite-like structures known as muqarnas.

History in Western Europe
It spread to the Romanesque architecture of western Europe, one example being the Normans' 12th-century church of San Cataldo, Palermo in Sicily.  This has three domes, each supported by four doubled squinches.

Etymology
The word may possibly originate, the Oxford English Dictionary suggests, from the French word escoinson, meaning "from an angle", which became the English word "scuncheon" and then "scunch".

References

External links

Domes
Arches and vaults
Architectural elements
Islamic architectural elements